Paul Miyamoto is an American sheriff. He is the 37th sheriff of San Francisco, the first Asian American sheriff in California history and the second from the department to be elected into office.

Early life 
Miyamoto is a native of San Francisco and a graduate of Lowell High School. His father was Philip Miyamoto, an appellate judge for the state of California of Japanese descent. His mother is of Chinese descent.

Miyamoto graduated from University of California, Davis in 1989.

Miyamoto has a law degree and has interned for the San Francisco District Attorney's Office.

San Francisco Sheriff's Department 
Miyamoto joined the San Francisco Sheriff's Department in 1996.

Sheriff 
He first ran for sheriff in 2011, placing second against Ross Mirkarimi. Mirkarimi promoted him from Captain to Assistant Sheriff in February 2012.

Miyamoto was Chief Deputy when he ran for sheriff to succeed Vicki Hennessy in 2019. He ran unopposed after his opponent Ron Terry dropped out of the race. He was sworn in on January 8, 2020, as the city's 37th sheriff.

In March 2020, at the beginning of the COVID-19 pandemic in San Francisco, Miyamoto suspended county jail visits and programs to preemptively stop the spread of COVID-19. Non-contact visits with legal counsel were permitted.

Personal life 
Miyamoto's family was interned during WWII at Heart Mountain Relocation Center. His grand-uncles served in 442nd Infantry Regiment. He is married with five children.

Miyamoto said that films like The Choirboys (1977) and End of Watch (2012) and television show Hill Street Blues (1981–1987) depict an accurate portrayal of law enforcement.

References

External links 

 San Francisco Chronicle profile about Miyamoto's family during WWII Japanese internment

California sheriffs
Living people
Lowell High School (San Francisco) alumni
University of California, Davis alumni
American politicians of Chinese descent
American politicians of Japanese descent
Year of birth missing (living people)